The Dornoch Firth is a firth on the east coast of Highland, in northern Scotland. It forms part of the boundary between Ross and Cromarty, to the south, and Sutherland, to the north. The firth is designated as a national scenic area, one of 40 such areas in Scotland. The national scenic area covers 15,782 ha in total, of which 4,240 ha is the marine area of the firth below low tide. A review of the national scenic areas by Scottish Natural Heritage in 2010 commented:
{{Blockquote|By comparison with other east coast firths the Dornoch Firth is narrow and sinuous, yet it
exhibits within its compass a surprising variety of landscapes. It is enclosed by abrupt rounded granitic hills clad in heather moor and scree, their Gaelic names of cnoc, meall and creag giving the clue to their character. Their lower slopes are frequently wooded, oakwoods being a noticeable feature of the area, but with other deciduous and coniferous species represented in plantations which vary from the policy plantings of Skibo Castle to the pines of the Struie Forest.|SNH<ref name=nsa-review>{{cite web|url=https://www.nature.scot/sites/default/files/2017-07/Publication%202010%20-%20SNH%20Commissioned%20Report%20374%20-%20The%20Special%20Qualities%20of%20the%20National%20Scenic%20Areas.pdf|title=The special qualities of the National Scenic Areas. Scottish Natural Heritage Commissioned Report No.374'|publisher=Scottish Natural Heritage|date=2010|access-date=2018-03-01}}</ref>}}

Together with Loch Fleet it is a designated as a Special Protection Area (SPA) for wildlife conservation purposes. Additionally, together with Morrich More, it has the designation of Special Area of Conservation (SAC).

The total SPA hosts significant populations of the following birds:

Breeding season: osprey (Pandion haliaetus)
Overwintering: bar-tailed godwit (Limosa lapponica), greylag goose (Anser anser), wigeon (Anas penelope), curlew (Numenius arquata), dunlin (Calidris alpina alpina), oystercatcher (Haematopus ostralegus), and teal (Anas crecca).

The SAC protects a variety of habitats, including salt meadows and coastal dune heathland and grassland. The site is of importance for otters (Lutra lutra) and harbour seals (Phoca vitulina'')

Crossing the firth

In 1991, the firth was bridged, the new Dornoch Firth Bridge providing a shorter route on the A9 road between Inverness and Thurso; until then traffic had to go by way of Bonar Bridge at the head of the inlet. There were proposals that the bridge should be constructed so as to allow the Far North railway line to also benefit from the shorter route, with the potential for up to 45 minutes to be saved on the journey between Inverness and Thurso/Wick. However this part of the scheme failed to secure government funding, and so only a road bridge was built.

On 16 August 1809 the firth was the scene of the Meikle Ferry disaster when an over-laden ferryboat sank with the loss of 99 lives.

References

External links 

Description from Gazetteer of Scotland
SPA designation - JNCC
SAC designation - JNCC
Series of photographs

Firths of Scotland
Landforms of Sutherland
Ross and Cromarty
National scenic areas of Scotland
Special Protection Areas in Scotland
Ramsar sites in Scotland
Sites of Special Scientific Interest in South East Sutherland
Sites of Special Scientific Interest in East Ross and Cromarty
Landforms of Highland (council area)